James Ruthven, Baron Ruthven FRSE (1777–1853) was a 19th-century Scottish peer and professional soldier.

Life

He was born at Melville House south of Monimail near Cupar in Fife on 17 October 1777. He was the eldest son of James Ruthven, 6th Lord Ruthven of Freeland and his wife, Lady Mary Elizabeth Leslie. He succeeded his father as 7th Lord Ruthven of Freeland in 1789.

Until 1807 he was a Major in the 90th Regiment of Foot also known as the Perthshire Volunteers.

In 1825 he was elected a Fellow of the Royal Society of Edinburgh his proposer being Sir Thomas Dick Lauder.

He died on 27 July 1853.

Family

In 1813 he married Mary Hamilton Campbell of Shawfield. They had no children.

See also
 Lord Ruthven of Freeland

References

1777 births
1853 deaths
People from Fife
Lords Ruthven of Freeland
Fellows of the Royal Society of Edinburgh